Ogwini Comprehensive Technical High School is located at Umlazi, KwaZulu-Natal, South Africa, located south-west of Durban. It had 3149 registered students in 2014.

Current principal :Dr V.S. Dlamini

References

Schools in KwaZulu-Natal
High schools in South Africa